
Hardwicke may refer to:

 Hardwicke (surname), a surname
 Earl of Hardwicke, a title in the Peerage of Great Britain

Places

Australia
 Hardwicke Bay, a bay in South Australia
 Hardwicke Bay, South Australia, a locality

Canada
 Hardwicke Parish, New Brunswick

England
 Hardwicke, Stroud, Gloucestershire
 Elmstone Hardwicke, Tewkesbury, Gloucestershire
 Hardwicke, Herefordshire, a hamlet in the parish of Clifford, Herefordshire (List of places in Herefordshire#H)

New Zealand
 Hardwicke, New Zealand

See also 

  Hardwick (disambiguation)